Raʾs al-Ḥadd is a village in Ash Sharqiyah district in Oman. It is on a point at the entrance to the Gulf of Oman.

The region is served by Ras al Hadd Airport.

Geography
Al Hajar Mountains are located to the west.

The beaches at Ras al Hadd and nearby Ra's al-Jinz are known as a breeding ground for green sea turtles.

Indian intelligence radar
There is an Indian listening post at Ras al Hadd, and berthing rights for the Indian Navy at Muscat naval base.

Landmarks

Ras Al Jinz Turtle Reserve 
The Easternmost peninsula in Oman hosts one of the world's most important populations of green turtles. Throughout the year, these vast sea-reptiles haul their weight of up to 190 Kilograms[12] from the sea at Ras Al Jinz to lay the future of this endangered species.

From the around 100 eggs, each female lays during a night, only one hatch-ling, may survive to maturity. Visitors to Ras Al Jinz will find the night walk to the beach may provide the rewarding experience of seeing the start of one of nature's most remarkable life cycles.

On 23 April 1996, Ras Al Jinz Turtle Reserve is designated as a nature reserve.

Shopping 
Located at the heart of Ras Al Hadd is the area's first shopping centre, Alfouz Hypermarket, which opened on 10 May 2018. The mall caters to the shopping needs of the people of Ras Al Hadd and also to tourists, with items from groceries to swimwear.

See also 
Eastern Arabia
Defence cooperation between Oman and India
List of lighthouses in Oman

References

External links
OpenStreetMap - Ras al Hadd

Headlands of Oman
Lighthouses in Oman
Indian Overseas Military bases
Populated coastal places in Oman
Ash Sharqiyah South Governorate